Renfrey Burnard (Ren) Potts AO (1925–2005) was an Australian mathematician and is notable for the Potts model and his achievements in: operations research, especially networks; transportation science, car-following and road traffic; Ising-type models in mathematical physics; difference equations; and robotics. He was interested in computing from the early days of the computing revolution and oversaw the first computer purchases at the University of Adelaide.

Personal
The fourth child of Gilbert MacDonald Potts and Lorna Potts (née West), named after family friend and medical doctor Renfrey Gershom Burnard, Potts was educated at Rose Park Primary School and Prince Alfred College, where his father was Second Master. Potts was an outstanding lecturer who drew large audiences to his talks. In addition to mathematics, he was interested in sports and music. His sporting activities included long distance and marathon running, hockey, tennis, squash, badminton, bushwalking, and swimming. He played both the piano and the clarinet and was a volunteer disc jockey at a local radio station. He married Barbara Kidman in Oxford on 1 July 1950. They had two daughters, Linda and Rebecca. They also had four grandchildren, Frank, Zoe, Jack and Georgia.

Summary
1925 Born: 4 October 1925  Adelaide, South Australia, Australia
1930–1936 Rose Park Primary School
1937–1942 Prince Alfred College
1943–1947 University of Adelaide Bachelor of Science (First class honours in mathematics) 
1948 Rhodes Scholar, Queen's College, Oxford
1949 Barbara Kidman graduated with first class Honours in Physics
1949–1951 D Phil, (Oxford), Dissertation: The Mathematical Investigation of Some Cooperative Phenomena, Advisor: Cyril Domb
1950 Married Barbara Kidman in Oxford on 1 July 1950
1951–1957 Lecturer in Mathematics at the University of Adelaide
1955–1956 Postdoctoral Scientist at the University of Maryland, USA 
1956 Barbara Kidman awarded a PhD
1957–1959 Associate Professor at the University of Toronto in Canada 
1958–1959 Consultant to General Motors in Detroit 
1959 Awarded the Lanchester Prize for research in operations research
1959 Appointed to a newly created chair in applied mathematics at the University of Adelaide  
1959–1990 Professor, Chair and popular lecturer of applied mathematics at the University of Adelaide
1966 Dr Kidman returns to workforce as lecturer in the (then) new area of Computer Science
1968 Doctor of Science (DSc) received from the University of Oxford 
1975 fellow of the Australian Academy of Science (FAA)
1976 Appointed (Sir Thomas) Elder Professor of Mathematics
 Foundation President of the South Australian Computer Society (the forerunner of the Australian Computer Society). He is recognised as the founder of the Australian Computer Society, and was elected a Fellow of that society (FACS).
1978–9 chairman, Division of Applied Mathematics of the Australian Mathematical Society (the progenitor of ANZIAM)
1983 Fellow of the Australian Academy of Technological Sciences and Engineering (FTSE) 
1987 Dr Kidman retires
1990 Prof Potts retires
1991 Emeritus Professor of Applied Mathematics at the University of Adelaide
1991 Officer of the Order of Australia (AO)
1991–1993 After his retirement from Adelaide, he taught as a visiting professor at the National University of Singapore for three semesters.
1994 Fellow of the Australian Mathematical Society (FAustMS)
1995 Inaugural recipient of the ANZAAS (Australian and New Zealand Association for the Advancement of Science) Medal 
1995 Awarded first ANZIAM Medal
2001 Centenary Medal received from the Australian Government 
2004 Inducted to the Pearcey Hall of Fame (The Pearcey Foundation) 
2005 Died: 9 August 2005  Adelaide, South Australia, Australia.

Publications

Most-cited publication:
Renfrey B. Potts, (1952); Some Generalized Order-Disorder Transformations, Proceedings of the Cambridge Philosophical Society, Vol. 48, pp. 106–109

Some others:
(Ren published about 90 research papers)

Books
With Robert Oliver, "Flows in Transportation Networks"
1978 Potts, R. B., "Transport in Australia: Some Key Issues", Australian Academy of Science, Canberra, 1978, 159 pp.

Book chapters
1990 Potts, R. B., "Wilton, John Raymond (1884–1944), Mathematician", in John Ritchie (ed.), Australian Dictionary of Biography, vol. 12, Melbourne University Press, Melbourne, 1990, pp. 533–534

Journal articles
1959  Harold Willis Milnes, Renfrey B. Potts: "Boundary Contraction Solution of Laplace's Differential Equation" J. ACM 6(2): 226–235 (1959)] Article
1959 Robert Herman, Elliott W. Montroll, Renfrey B. Potts, and Richard W. Rohtery, "Traffic Dynamics: Analysis of Stability in Car Following", Operations Research 7, pp. 86–106 (January–February 1959)
1959 Denos C. Gazis, Robert Herman, and Renfrey B. Potts, "Car-Following Theory of Steady-State Traffic Flow", Operations Research 7, pp. 499–505 (July–August 1959). 
1962 "The Measurement of Acceleration Noise—A Traffic Parameter", Trevor R. Jones, Renfrey B. Potts, Operations Research, Vol. 10, No. 6 (Nov. – Dec. 1962), pp. 745–763 Abstract
1982 "Differential and Difference Equations", Renfrey B. Potts, The American Mathematical Monthly, Vol. 89, No. 6 (Jun. – Jul. 1982), pp. 402–407  Abstract
1985 Potts, R. B., "Mathematics at the University of Adelaide, Part 3: 1944–1958", Australian Mathematical Society Gazette, vol. 12, no. 2, 1985, pp. 25–30.
1988 Tamar Flash, Renfrey B. Potts: "Discrete trajectory planning". October 1988, International Journal of Robotics Research, Volume 7 Issue 5 ACM PortalAbstract
2004 Wall, G. E., Pitman, Jane and Potts, R. B., "Eric Stephen Barnes, 1924–2000", Historical Records of Australian Science, vol. 15, no. 1, 2004, pp. 21–45. (Also available at http://www.publish.csiro.au/paper/HR03013.htm and https://web.archive.org/web/20090929205257/http://www.science.org.au/academy/memoirs/barnes.htm)

Affiliations
1959 General Motors Corporation, Detroit, Michigan 
1960s–1980s P.G. Pak-Poy & Associates, Adelaide
1988 Weizmann Institute of Science, Rehovot, Israel

Awards
  Officer of the Order of Australia (AO) 1991
  Centenary Medal 2001

See also
Mathematics Genealogy Project
Bright Spacs Biography entry
Portrait — date unknown, St Andrews 
Portrait — date unknown, St Andrews 
Biography, St Andrews 
Obituary, Australian Mathematics Trust
Obituary, Australian Academy of Technological Sciences and Engineering 
"Obituaries", Australian Academy of Science Newsletter, vol. 63, August–November 2005, pp. 10–11.
E O Tuck, Obituary — Professor Renfrey Burnard Potts, The Adelaidean (October 2005). 
E O Tuck, Obituary : Renfrey B. Potts, 4/10/1925–9/8/2005, Austral. Math. Soc. Gaz. 32 (4) (2005), 291–292. 
E O Tuck, Retirement of Professor R. B. Potts, AO, Austral. Math. Soc. Gaz. 18 (4) (1991), 111–112. 
2003 photo of Dr Barbara Kidman and Emeritus Professor Ren Potts, Adelaidean, Volume 12 Number 7 August 2003, pg14
Biography of Renfrey Potts from the Institute for Operations Research and the Management Sciences

References

Australian mathematicians
20th-century Australian mathematicians
Alumni of The Queen's College, Oxford
Australian Rhodes Scholars
Fellows of the Australian Academy of Science
Monte Carlo methodologists
Recipients of the Centenary Medal
Officers of the Order of Australia
People educated at Prince Alfred College
University of Adelaide alumni
Academic staff of the University of Adelaide
1925 births
2005 deaths
Fellows of the Australian Academy of Technological Sciences and Engineering